Lou Frizzell (June 10, 1919 – June 17, 1979) was an American actor and music director who worked on Broadway productions, television shows and films. He was perhaps best known for playing Dusty Rhodes in the American western television series Bonanza. Frizzell died in June 1979 of lung cancer at his home in Los Angeles, California, at the age of 60.

Filmography

References

External links
 

1919 births
1979 deaths
Male actors from Missouri
Music directors
American male film actors
American male television actors
20th-century American male actors
Western (genre) television actors
Deaths from lung cancer in California